Ausländer or Auslander may refer to:

Surname
 Joseph Auslander (1897–1965), American poet
 Leora Auslander (born 1959), American historian
 Louis Auslander (1928–1997), American mathematician
 Marc Auslander, American computer scientist
 Maurice Auslander (1926–1994), American mathematician
 Rose Ausländer (1901–1988), German and American poet
 Shalom Auslander (born 1970), American author and essayist

Other uses 
 "Ausländer" (Living Colour song)
 "Ausländer" (Rammstein song)